These are the official results of the Women's 1500 metres event at the 1972 Summer Olympics in Munich. The competition was held on 4 of September & 9 of September.  This was the first time this distance was held for women at the Olympics.

Ludmila Bragina had just set the world record a month and a half earlier, knocking two and a half seconds off of Karin Burneleit's previous record.  Burneleit was in the field, as were previous record holders Jaroslava Jehličková and Paola Pigni.  In the first heat, Bragina improved upon her world record by .4.  A step behind her, seventeen year old Glenda Reiser set the world junior record, also running faster than the world record at the start of that race.  Reiser's time would also qualify as the World Youth Best.

In the first semi final, Reiser was not so lucky, not only did she not run as fast, but she didn't qualify for the final.  In the second semi final, Bragina again improved the world record by almost a second and a half, while Jehličková was eliminated.

In the final, Berny Boxem was the early leader, while Bragina languished in dead last place.  After the first 600 metres, Bragina decided to change that, moving to the outside and running past the field at a quicker tempo.  Only long striding Berny Boxem was able to go with her as Bragina opened up a 10-metre lead on the field.  After another 300 metres, Boxem began to fade and was quickly swallowed up by the front of the pack led by Sheila Carey.  At the bell Ellen Tittel dropped out, collapsing onto the high jump apron while Bragina continued to expand her lead.  Gunhild Hoffmeister moved past Carey into second place but they all were losing ground to Bragina.  Several places back, Pigni launched into her kick, passing Burneleit, Keizer, Carey and almost catching Hoffmeister.  But Hoffmeister noticed and defended her position, battling to stay ahead.  Twice on the home stretch, with her arms flailing, Pigni looked to draw even with Hoffmeister, but each time Hoffmeister edged ahead to take the silver medal.  Not only did Bragina set a third consecutive world record, but the next four competitors behind her beat her world record from two days earlier.  Even sixth place Keizer was only .06 behind the previous record, at a time when records were only accurate to .1 of a second.

Heats
The top four runners in each heat (blue) and the next two fastest (pink), advanced to the semifinal round.

Heat one

Heat two

Heat three

Heat four

Semifinals

The top four runners in each heat (blue) and the next two fastest (pink), advanced to the final round.

Heat one

Heat two

Final

Key: WR = world record; OR = Olympic record; DNS = did not start; DNF = did not finish

References

External links
Official report

Women's 1500 metres
1500 metres at the Olympics
1972 in women's athletics
Women's events at the 1972 Summer Olympics